Datuk Dell Akbar Khan bin Hyder Khan commonly known as Dell Akbar Khan is a Malaysian former football player, football administrator and former civil servant. He played for the Malaysian national football team, and also played for PDRM FA and Selangor FA in Malaysia's domestic competition in the 1960s and 1970s.

Dell played for Malaysia from 1968 to 1973, and played in the qualification games for 1972 Summer Olympics, although he was not selected in the national team for the finals in Munich.

After retiring from playing, he holds various positions in Football Association of Malaysia (FAM) such as Malaysia senior team manager in the late 1990s, and FAM's Secretary-General from 2000 until 2005. He was also selected as FIFA venue security officer for the 2010 FIFA World Cup in South Africa.

By profession, Dell is a police officer and enrolled in Royal Malaysia Police from 1970, until his retirement in 2004. His last position is as a Chief Police Officer of Kuala Lumpur. After his retirement from police service, he has since become director or executive vice-president of various companies in Malaysia. He was awarded the Datuk title by the Sultan of Selangor in 2003.

His late older brother Sardar Khan was also a football player for Selangor and Malaysia. He is the former police chief of Kuala Lumpur, and currently working as vice-president of the Malaysian Resources Corporation Bhd (MRCB)

Honours
 :
 Member of the Order of the Defender of the Realm (AMN) (1980)
 Herald of the Order of Loyalty to the Royal Family of Malaysia (BSD) (1982)
 Companion of the Order of Loyalty to the Royal Family of Malaysia (JSD) (1989)
 Commander of the Order of Loyalty to the Royal Family of Malaysia (PSD) - Datuk (2004)
 :
 Knight Companion of the Order of the Crown of Pahang (DIMP) - Dato' (1999)
 Knight Companion of the Order of Sultan Ahmad Shah of Pahang (DSAP) - Dato' (2002)
 Royal Malaysia Police :
 Loyal Commander of the Most Gallant Police Order (PSPP) (2003)
 :
 Knight Commander of the Order of the Crown of Selangor (DPMS) - Dato' (2003)

References

Malaysian police officers
Sportspeople from Kuala Lumpur
Malaysian people of Pakistani descent
Malaysian Muslims
PDRM FA players
Malaysian footballers
Malaysia international footballers
Selangor FA players
Association football defenders
Year of birth missing
Members of the Order of the Defender of the Realm
Heralds of the Order of Loyalty to the Royal Family of Malaysia
Companions of the Order of Loyalty to the Royal Family of Malaysia
Commanders of the Order of Loyalty to the Royal Family of Malaysia
Knights Commander of the Order of the Crown of Selangor